The Guild of Fine Food (GFF) is a British family-owned industry journal publisher that covers gourmet food news. It was founded by Bob Farrand in 1992.

All five directors are members of the Farrand family. Bob Farrand is the chairman, his son John Farrand is the managing director, daughter-in-law Tortie Farrand marketing director, his wife Linda Farrand a director and niece Sally Coley 

GFF promotes the Great Taste Awards and also the World Cheese Awards, which were initiated in 1988.

From its base in Gillingham, near Shaftesbury in Dorset, it promotes producers and sellers of "artisan food and drink" across England, Wales, Scotland and Northern Ireland.

Great Taste Awards
The Great Taste Awards are open to members and non-members, but only products that pay an entry fee of between £38 and £240 per product are judged. Winning products receive one, two or three stars. In 2018, 12,634 food and drink products were judged.

World Cheese Awards
The World Cheese Award "World Champion" has been awarded to:

References

Clubs and societies in the United Kingdom
Food and drink awards
British food and drink organisations
Companies based in Dorset
Family-owned companies of the United Kingdom